Keith Anthony Morrison, Commander of Distinction (C.D.), born May 20, 1942), is a Jamaican-born painter, printmaker, educator, critic, curator and administrator. 

He has exhibited worldwide, including in the Venice Biennale; the Caribbean Biennale; the Art Institute of Chicago; Museum of Contemporary Art, Chicago; Museum of Modern Art, Monterrey, Mexico; the Smithsonian American Museum; The Philadelphia Museum of Art; the Pennsylvania Academy of Art; and the de Young Museum, San Francisco. In the USA he has had solo exhibitions in cities such as New York, Washington, Chicago, Philadelphia, San Francisco and Boston. Worldwide he has exhibited in  countries such as Jamaica, Dominican Republic, Cuba, Brazil, Japan, China, England, France, Germany, Italy, Yugoslavia, Poland, Liberia, Argentina, Mexico and India.

Morrison has had a significant career as a writer also, having published in many periodicals and museum catalogs. His 1979 article "Art Criticism: A Pan-African Point of View" (Pub. New Art Examiner) is widely considered a landmark theory of abstraction by African American artists. His book "Art in Washington and Its Afro-American Presence: 1940-1970" (Stephenson Press, 1985) is regarded as the seminal exploration of that period and place in American art history. Among his many other publications are: "African American visual Aesthetics" (Smithsonian, Press 1996);  "Pin-pricked Deities: The Art of Joyce Scott" (Baltimore Museum, 2000; Keith Anthony Morrison is also a notable curator, having organized exhibitions in Cuba, the USA and his native Jamaica. He represented Jamaica as an artist in the 2001 Venice Biennale. In 2008 he represented the USA as a critic at the Shanghai Biennale. Morrison served as Dean of Tyler School of Art; Temple University, Philadelphia; Dean for the College of Creative Arts, San Francisco State University; Dean for Academic Affairs, San Francisco Art Institute, and Dean for the College of Arts and Humanities at the University of Maryland, College Park, where he was previously Professor and Chair of the Art Department. 
He was also a Distinguished Visiting Artist/Scholar at the University of Michigan, Ann Arbor. Previously he was Associate Dean and Associate Professor, University of Illinois, Chicago; Art Department Chair, DePaul University; and Assistant Professor of Art at Fisk University. Morrison studied at the School of the Art Institute of Chicago, where he received a BFA in 1963 and MFA in 1965. Keith Morrison, a book written by art historian Dr. Rene Ater, was published by Pomegranate Press in 2004. More information may be found elsewhere on the web, including museum and university websites, and at www.keithmorrison.com

Career 

Morrison studied art at the School of the Art Institute of Chicago, with academics at the University of Chicago, and earned a BFA in spring 1963. In the fall 1963, he returned to the School of the Art Institute of Chicago, earning an MFA in 1965. He completed further graduate study at DePaul University and Loyola University, earning the equivalent of a master's degree in Art Education in 1967. He holds the Jamaican title of National Honors, Commander in the Order of Distinction (C.D.).

Morrison has exhibited his paintings and prints across the US, his native Jamaica, and abroad and was selected to represent Jamaica at the 2001 Venice Biennale. His paintings, drawings and prints have been shown in countries such as China, Columbia, Brazil, Egypt, France, Germany, Italy, Liberia, Mexico, Nigeria, and Japan. His works are included in numerous private and public collections, including those of the National Gallery of Art, the Cincinnati Art Museum, the Art Institute of Chicago; the Smithsonian Museum of American Art, the [[Pennsylvania Academy of the Fine Art, the Corcoran Gallery of Art; the National Museum of American Art; the Museum of Modern Art, Monterrey, the High Museum, Mexico; the Caribbean Biennale, the Havana Biennale, the Philadelphia Museum of Art, the Pennsylvania Academy of Art, the World Bank; the Washington Post; the Burrell Advertising Collection, and the Jamaica Institute of Art. He has also exhibited in numerous art galleries worldwide, including US solo shows in New York, Boston, Detroit, Chicago, Philadelphia, Washington DC, and San Francisco. Morrison has had many solo exhibitions, including shows at the University of Delaware Museums, 511 Gallery, NYC; Miller/Geisler Gallery, NYC; the DeYoung Museum, San Francisco; the Bomani Gallery, San Francisco, the Luce Gallery, Cornell College, the Jan Cicero Gallery]], Chicago; Brody's Gallery, Washington, DC; the Liz Harris Gallery, Boston; Cavin-Morris Gallery and The Alternative Museum, both in New York City. His work has been included in hundreds of group exhibitions, including exhibits at the National American Museum of Art, Smithsonian Institution, Cincinnati Art Museum, High Museum, Newark Art Museum, Art Institute of Chicago, the M. H. de Young Memorial Museum, the Bronx Museum of the Arts|Bronx Museum; the Wadsworth Athenaeum; the Museum of Contemporary Art, Chicago; the Butler Museum of American Art; the Southeast Center for Contemporary Art, Winston-Salem, North Carolina; and the Hyde Park Art Center, Chicago.

He has been called an American artist but no less so a Jamaican one, having represented both countries. Morrison represented Jamaica in the 1994 Caribbean Biennial in Santo Domingo. In 2001 Morrison represented Jamaica in the globally prestigious Venice Biennale. In 2008 he represented the USA as an art critic and cultural envoy to the Shanghai Biennale.

Morrison's work has been featured in many publications, including the book African Diaspora in the Cultures of Latin America, the Caribbean, and the United States, an anthology of essays by 14 scholars, which includes one of his paintings on the cover and 10 inside; the Getty Museum's Mortality/Immortality; Myth and Magic in the Americas: the Eighties, by Charles Mereweather/Museum of Modern Art, Monterrey, Mexico; Lucy Lippards' Mixed Blessings; Reginia Perry's Free Within Ourselves; David Driskell's Contemporary Visual Expressions; Samella Lewis’ Caribbean Visions; Richard Powell's Black Art and Culture in the 20th Century; Virginia Mecklenburg's African American Art from the Harlem Renaissance to the Civil Rights Era and Beyond, Smithsonian Institution; Veerle Poupeye’s Caribbean Art; Crystal Britton’s African–American Art: The Long Hard Struggle; Judith Bettelheim's essay "A Transnational Artist with a Jamaica Soul", African Arts Magazine, 1996; and Art in Chicago: The First 50 Years, 1996. Keith Morrison, a biography, Pomegranate Press, was written by Rene Ater in 2004.

In 2022, Morrison curated "Caribbean Visions," an exhibition of 20 internationally distinguished artists of Caribbean descent, at the Katzen Museum in Washington, DC. An extensive color catalog accompanied the exhibition. 

In 2019 the Katzen Museum in Washington DC held a large solo exhibition of Keith Morrison’s paintings on canvas and watercolors on paper. The exhibition, curated by Judith Stein, former Chief Curator of the Pennsylvania Academy of Art, was accompanied by a color catalog. In 2012 an exhibition of Keith Morrison's paintings, titled "The Middle Passage," curated by Julie McGee, was held at the University of Delaware Museums. Fourteen international scholars were assembled to make presentations at a symposium that was created around the exhibition. In 2014 the book African Diaspora in the Cultures of Latin America, the Caribbean, and the United States, edited by Persephone Braham (University of Delaware Press), was published to document the symposium that was formed around Morrison's art.

Morrison has curated many other exhibitions, including "Magical Visions," an exhibition of 10 international African-American artists, at the University of Delaware Museums, 20012. The exhibition included art by Terry Adkins, Sonya Clark, Mel Edwards, Sam Gilliam, Barkley L. Hendricks, Kalup Linzy, Odili Odita, Karyn Olivier, Faith Ringgold, and William T. Williams. Morrison curated The Curator's Eye III: 'Ceremony in Space, Time and Sound,' Multimedia and Performance Art in Jamaica, National Gallery of Art, Kingston, Jamaica, in 2008. The exhibition included 14 Jamaican artists, some living abroad but most at home. The exhibition included more traditional art, such as painting, sculpture, and ceramics, and newer kinds of art, such as video and performance art. Morrison's idea was to show that Jamaica was a source of some new art ideas, comparable to anywhere in the world. The exhibition was accompanied by a catalog, which Morrison wrote, describing the exhibition's concept and articulating ideas in it. The catalog included a biography of each artist.

In 1999 Morrison traveled to Cuba and, with the help of the Ludwig Foundation of Cuba, organized an exhibition of contemporary Cuban artists, which he toured to the US and exhibited at San Francisco State University. The exhibition, accompanied by a catalog the curator wrote, included lithographs, photographs, videos and film.

In 1985, Morrison curated Art in Washington and Its African American Presence: 1940-1970, an exhibition of more than 60 artists and more than 50 works of African art at the Washington Project for the Arts Gallery in Washington, DC. The 60+ artists were American, African, Caribbean, European, and others of mixed heritage. He borrowed their art from Howard University, the Barnett Aden Collection, the Corcoran Gallery of Art, the Phillips Collection, and private collectors. The 50+ African works were classical pieces he borrowed from the Smithsonian Institution.

Working with Warren Robbins, founding Director of the Museum of African Art, Smithsonian Institution, Morrison conceived an exhibition that linked African Art, African-American art, art by Caucasians in the USA, the art of the Caribbean, European art, and art of South America. The exhibition and accompanying researched book-length color catalog, which Morrison wrote, revealed the important contribution to American art that was made by Howard University and the Barnett-Aden Gallery in the development of not only African-American art, or even American art, but world art in general. The exhibition included artists from countries such as Brazil, Cuba, Ethiopia, France, Germany, Haiti, Nigeria, Sudan, Switzerland, the USA and the UK and showed the global scope of thinking that originated among African-American artists, curators, and scholars of the era, such as W. E. B. DuBois, Langston Hughes, Alain Locke, James Porter, Alonzo Aden and James Herring. Some, including the Washington Post and the Washington Times, called it one of the most important exhibitions in the history of Washington.

In 1969 Morrison curated the exhibition Jacob Lawrence’s Toussaint L’Ouverture Series at DePaul University Gallery, Chicago. The exhibition included 39 works from Jacob Lawrence's historic series of paintings. In 1996 Morrison curated "Contemporary Print Images," a Smithsonian Institution Internationa Travel Exhibition to the National Museum, Bamako, Mali; American Cultural Center, Niamey, Niger; School of Fine Arts Gallery, Makerere University, Kampala, Uganda; and Municipal Gallery, Addis Ababa, Ethiopia. He curated Black Art '71, Bergman Gallery, University of Chicago; African-American Art in Washington (Sam Gilliam, Martha Jackson Jarvis, Joyce J. Scott Joyce Scott, Jerome Meadows, Sylvia Snowden, Sherman Fleming), WPA Gallery; Art from Washington. Nexus Gallery, Philadelphia; Prints at the Brandywine Workshop, Philadelphia; "Metaphor/Commentaries: Artists from Cuba (1999); "The Curator's Eye," National Gallery of Art, Kingston, Jamaica, (2008; and "Magical Visions," (including Terry Adkins, Sonya Clark, Mel Edwards, Sam Gilliam, Barkley L. Hendricks, Kalup Linzy, Karyn Olivia, Odilli Odita, Faith Ringgold,  William T. Williams (the University of Delaware Museum, (2012). In 2022, he curated "Caribbean Transitions" at the Katzen Museum, Washington DC.

He has served as an art consultant for many state arts agencies in the United States. He is a former commentator for the weekly TV program Around Town, broadcast by WETA-TV in Washington DC.

A writer and critic, Morrison has published articles, essays, catalogs, and reviews in periodicals, newspapers, and museum catalogs and was an editor for the New Art Examiner. He is the author of Art in Washington and Its Afro-American Presence: 1940-1970, Stephenson Press, VA, 1985. He wrote "Caribbean Transitions, Katzen Museum, 2022. He wrote Pin-Pricked Deities, the Art of Joyce Scott," Baltimore Museum 2000. He co-authored with David C. Driskell, Juanita Holland, and others: "Narratives of African American Art and Identity, Smithsonian Institution, 1999. He has contributed articles to numerous publications, including more than 40 articles for the New Art Examiner (where he was guest editor); articles for American Visions, the Washington Post, the USIA, the University of Chicago, and the Smithsonian Institution. He has written catalog essays for museums such as the Baltimore Museum of Art, the Corcoran Gallery of Art, the M.H. de Young Memorial Museum, the Getty Museum, the Alternative Museum, and Pomegranate Press; and Stephenson Press. He wrote the catalog essay "Ceremony in Space Sound and Time" at the National Gallery of Jamaica, essays for the Brandywine Workshop, the University of Chicago, and the catalog essay "Magical Visions", at the University of Delaware Museums. His book, "Art in Washington and Its Afro-American Presence: 1940-1970" (Stephenson Press, 1885), and his article for the New Art Examiner (reprinted, Northern Illinois University Press/NEA, 2012), "Art Criticism: a Pan-African Point of View," are both widely considered seminal works in the field.

Morrison has consulted on art for many agencies, public and private. In 1971 he was consultant, briefly, to the Caribbean author John Hearne at the Creative Art Centre at the University of the West Indies, Jamaica; and to collector/proprietor A. D. Scott, on Jamaican art, at the Olympia Gallery, Kingston, Jamaica. Morrison has served on several artboards and state agencies in Massachusetts, Pennsylvania, Maryland, Virginia, Tennessee, Illinois, and California in the US. He was a cultural-economic consultant for the Harlem Urban Development Corporation, New York, NY.

Morrison was a frequent panelist on the weekly TV show Around Town in Washington DC between 1998 and 2002. He has made numerous other TV appearances, some in Jamaica but most in the US. Maryland Public TV made a film of his work 1n 1990. PBS featured his curated exhibition Magical Visions in 2012. He was one of five international artists featured in the PBS film Free Within Ourselves.

He has lectured worldwide in countries such as Jamaica, China, Cuba, Canada, Japan, Liberia, Taiwan, and the US. He has lectured in institutions such as the San Francisco Art Institute, Metropolitan Museum of Art; Getty Museum; Art Institute of Chicago; the Smithsonian Institution; the College Art Association of America; the Modern Language Association of America; the Cooper Union Institute; the Crocker Museum; the Cincinnati Museum of Art; the Massachusetts College of Art; the California Institute of Art; the Baltimore Institute of Art; the Maryland Institute College of Art; the University of the West Indies, Jamaica; and the University of Liberia. Morrison gave the 50th Anniversary address for the Edna Manley School of Art, Jamaica, 2001. He gave keynote addresses at UC Berkeley; the San Francisco Art Institute; the Brandywine Workshop; the DuSable Museum; the National Museum of American History; and the Ludwig Foundation of Havana, Cuba.

In 2017 Keith Morrison's book, "Art in Washington and Its Afro-American Presence: 1940-1970," was the foundation for the National Gallery of Art's Symposium on African-American Art in Washington, D.C. in the Mid-Twentieth Century.

Morrison's work has been reviewed in many publications, including the Jamaica Gleaner, Jamaica Observer, New York Times, New Yorker. Art News, Art Forum, Art in America, Smithsonian Magazine, New Art Examiner, Chicago Sun Times, Chicago Tribune, Washington Post, Washington Times, San Francisco Chronicle, and African Arts.

As an arts administrator, Morrison served as Chair of the Art Department, DePaul University, Chicago, from 1969 to 1971. He successfully proposed and wrote undergraduate degree programs in Art and Art Education. He was appointed Associate Dean of the College of Architecture and Art at the University of Illinois, Chicago (1972–76). From 1987 to 1992, he was Chair of the Art Department, University of Maryland, College Park. At the University of Maryland, he created a lecture series for women and minorities, which brought lecturers from across the country. From January 1993 to June 1994, he was Dean for Academic Affairs at the San Francisco Art Institute. From May 1994 to July 1996, he was Dean of the College of Creative Arts at San Francisco State University. From August 1996 to January 1997, he was Dean of the College of Arts and Humanities at the University of Maryland, College Park. In February 1997, he returned to his former position of Dean of the College of Creative Arts at San Francisco State University, a position he held until 2005. At San Francisco State, he raised funds, created festivals and exhibitions in Art, Film, Music, and Theatre, and led the departments of Cinema and Music to elite national and international ranking. He was also the founder and director of the annual international John Handy Jazz Festival, held at San Francisco State University, 2000–01. Morrison was appointed Dean for the Tyler School of Arts at Temple University from 2005 to 2008. At Tyler, he restructured the budget, expanded the programs internationally to include Africa, Asia, Central, and South America, and added many faculty and lab technicians.

In addition to his work as an art administrator, Morrison has had a distinguished career as a teacher. His first teaching appointment was as an art instructor at Roosevelt High School in Gary, Indiana, 1965-67. He was Assistant Professor of Art at Fisk University, 1967–69; Associate Professor and Chair of Art, DePaul University, 1969–71; Associate Professor of Art (serving as Associate Dean, 1974–79) at the University of Illinois, Chicago, 1971-79. In 1979 he became only the fourth African American to be appointed full professor in the history of the University of Maryland, College Park (UMCP), where he taught until 1992. He was appointed Chair of the UMCP Art Department from 1989 until his departure in 1992. Morrison has also been a visiting faculty at several institutions, including as the visiting Chaves/King Professor, at the University of Michigan, Ann Arbor, with a joint appointment in the School of Art and the Institute for the Humanities, in the spring of 1990. He has lectured at numerous art schools and universities across us, in Cuba, Japan, Taiwan, and Liberia, and many universities across China. He is Professor Emeritus in the Tyler School of Art, Temple University.

A book on the artist, titled Keith Morrison, written by art historian René Ater, was published by Pomegranate Press in 2005. The book African Diaspora in the Cultures of Latin America, the Caribbean, and the United States (Persephone Braham, University of Delaware Press) was inspired by the art of Keith Morrison.

Distinctions

Morrison has earned many awards and distinctions, including the title of Commander in the Order of Distinction (CD), Jamaica, 2017; the Lifetime Achievement Award from the Brandywine Workshop, 2013; a Ford Foundation award; Danforth Foundation award; Bi-Centennial Award for Painting in Chicago; Award for Painting from the Organization of African States, 1979; Caribbean Biannual, 1994; Venice Biennale, 2001; National Award for Educators in the Arts; "Caribbean person of the Bay Area," California, 1993; US State Department Cultural Envoy to the Shanghai Biennale, 2008; Fulbright Award, 2009.
He was the first person of African descent to serve as academic dean in a predominantly Caucasian American art school or university, an accomplishment he has achieved five times.

Bibliography
 Stein, Judith: Passages: Keith Morrison: 1999-2019, Katzen Art Center, Washington DC, June–August, 2019.
 Braham, Persephone: African Diaspora in the Cultures of Latin America, the Caribbean, and the United States, University of Delaware Press, 2014.
 Edmunds, Allan: Keith Morrison, Lifetime Achievement, Brandywine Workshop, May 2013.
 Knight, Franklin, "Art of Keith Morrison", Jamaica Observer, November 2011.
 McGee, Julie: Keith Morrison: The Middle Passage, University of Delaware Museums, September 7, 2011. 
 Chen-Young, Leisha: "An Artistic Eye", Jamaica Observer, June 15, 2008.
 Ater, Rene: Keith Morrison, Pomegranate Press, 2005.
 Driskell, David C: The Other Side of Color; San Francisco: Pomegranate Press, 2001.
 Amidon, Catherine: Migration, Transition, and Change; New York: Venice Biennale, 2001.
 Morrison, Keith. "Preserving Whose Mortality or Immortality?" pp. 161–164, Mortality/Immortality?: The Legacy of 20th Century Art. Miguel Angel Corzo, editor, Los Angeles: The Getty Conservation Institute, 1999.
 Bettelheim, Judith A. "Three Transnational Artists: Jose Bedia, Eduoard Duval-Carrié and Keith Morrison." pp. 43–48, The International Review of African American Art, 1998, Vol. 15, No. 3.
 Burgard, Timothy Anglin. Art and Ethnography, San Francisco: M.H. de Young Memorial Museum, 1998.
 Poupeye, Veerle. Caribbean Art, New York: Thames and Hudson, 1998.
 Powell, Richard. Black Art and Culture in the Twentieth Century, London: Thames and Hudson, 1997.
 Baker, Kenneth. "Keith Morrison's Art is the Stuff of Dreams", p. E1, San Francisco Chronicle, April 13, 1996.
 Berkson, Bill. Chaos Dancer, San Francisco: Bomani Gallery, 1996.
 Bettelheim, Judith. A Transnational Artist with a Jamaica Soul, San Francisco: Bomani Gallery, 1996.
 Art in Chicago, 1945-95, Chicago: Museum of Contemporary Art, 1996.
 Britton, Crystal A. African American Art: The Long Struggle, New York: Smithmark, 1996.
 Lewis, Samella. Caribbean Visions, Richmond, VA: Art Services International, 1995.
 Driskell, David C., editor, African American Visual Aesthetics: A Postmodernist View (Smithsonian Institution Press, 1995).
 Risatti, Howard. "Keith Morrison at Brody Gallery" p. 108, Artforum, January 1992.
 Perry, Regina A. Free Within Ourselves: African-American Artists in the Collection of the National Museum of American Art. pp. 147–149, Washington, DC: National Museum of American Art, Smithsonian Institution, 1992.
 Mereweather, Charles: Myth and Magic, In the Americas: The Eighties; Monterrey: Museum of Modern Art, 1991.
 Lippard, Lucy. Mixed Blessings: New Art in a Multicultural America, New York: Pantheon Books, 1990.
 Smith, Roberta. "The Galleries of TriBeCa and What's in Them" p. C22, The New York Times, April 27, 1990.
 Driskell, David C. Keith Morrison: Interpreter of the Mythic Dream, New York: Alternative Museum, 1990.
 Powell, Richard. Anansi Revisited: Keith Morrison's New Work, New York: Alternative Museum, 1990.
 Francis, Irma Talabi. "Keith Morrison: Spiritual Obsession", Eyewash, November 1990.
 Powell, Richard, The Blues Aesthetics, WPA, Washington DC, 2001.
 Driskell, David C. Contemporary Visual Expressions, Smithsonian Press, 1987.
 Forgey, Benjamin. "Urban Expressions: Contemporary Art Opens at Anacostia." p. G7, The Washington Post, May 16, 1987.
 Bontemps, Arna Alexander. Choosing. Washington DC: Museum Press, 1985, pp. 60–61.
 Laing, E. K. "Why it's important to bring black artists out of cultural isolation." p. 29, The Christian Science Monitor, November 20, 1985.
 Richard, Paul. "Black Artists: Their Pride & Problems: Keith Morrison"; The Washington Post, March 15, 19.
 East/West: Contemporary American Art; Los Angeles: California Afro-American Museum, 1985.
 Livingston, Jane: Ten + Ten + Ten; Washington, D.C.: Corcoran Gallery of Art, 1984.
 Cederholm, Theresa Dickason, editor, Afro-American Artists (Boston Public Library, 1973).

References

External links
Keith Morrison Website
Temple University press release announcing Morrison appointment

Jamaican emigrants to the United States
Fisk University faculty
DePaul University faculty
University of Michigan staff
Living people
1942 births
School of the Art Institute of Chicago alumni